The 2015 Deutsche Tourenwagen Masters was the twenty-ninth season of premier German touring car championship and also sixteenth season under the moniker of Deutsche Tourenwagen Masters since the series' resumption in 2000. The season started on 2 May at Hockenheim, and ended on 18 October at the same venue, with Mercedes Benz driver Pascal Wehrlein clinching the Drivers' Championship, Mercedes Benz's HWA AG winning the Teams' Championship and BMW taking the Manufacturer's Championship after a total of nine events.

Marco Wittmann entered the season as the defending Drivers' Champion, BMW Team RMG as the defending Teams' Champion and Audi as the defending Manufacturers' Champion.

Rule changes

Sporting
 Drivers were assigned permanent numbers for the duration of their DTM careers, with the championship adopting a system similar to the one used in Formula One and MotoGP. The number 1 was the champion's right, with drivers free to choose any number from 2 to 99 or 100; the champion's "regular" number was reserved while they were using the number 1.
 The 2015 season saw the DTM series go back to a two races per weekend format. It was the first time since 2002 that the DTM used the format but the usual number of laps were replaced by time limit.
The usual knockout qualifying format was replaced by 20-minute single-session qualifying format (similar to 60-minute 1996-2002 Formula One single-session qualifying format).

Technical
The weight of all DTM cars were increased to 1,120 kg.
The performance weights also has been introduced.
The softer optional tyres were removed to provide overtaking manoeuvre.

Teams and drivers
The following manufacturers, teams and drivers competed in the 2015 Deutsche Tourenwagen Masters. All teams competed with tyres supplied by Hankook.

Team changes
 ART Grand Prix joined the series in 2015, and ran a Mercedes works team of two cars, for Lucas Auer and Gary Paffett.

Driver changes
 Entering DTM
 Maximilian Götz, who won the 2014 Blancpain Sprint Series, joined Mercedes-Benz.
 European Formula 3 front-runners Lucas Auer and Tom Blomqvist joined the series, driving for Mercedes-Benz and BMW respectively.

 Leaving DTM
 Joey Hand, who drove for BMW between 2012 and 2014, left the series and joined the United SportsCar Championship.
 Vitaly Petrov, who drove for Mercedes-Benz in 2014, left the series.

 Mid-season changes
 Timo Scheider was excluded from participating in the Moscow Raceway round after pushing out both Robert Wickens and Pascal Wehrlein in the second race of the Red Bull Ring. European Formula 3 front-runner Antonio Giovinazzi replaced him at the Russian venue for Audi Sport Team Phoenix.

Performance weights
Starting from Norisring, ITR introduced a system of ballast based on the results obtained in the previous race. The basis weight is 1120 kg, and performance weight ranges from a minimum of 1105 kg to a maximum of 1140 kg

Race calendar and results
The nine event calendar was announced on 3 December 2014.

Calendar changes
 The round at the Hungaroring – which had been included on the DTM calendar in 1988 and 2014 – was discontinued.

Championship standings
Scoring system
Points were awarded to the top ten classified finishers as follows:

Drivers' championship

† — Driver retired, but was classified as they completed 75% of the winner's race distance.

Teams' championship

Manufacturers' championship

Notes

References

External links
  

Deutsche Tourenwagen Masters seasons
Deutsche Tourenwagen Masters